Below is a list of notable footballers who have played for Heart of Midlothian ("Hearts"). It generally includes only players who made more than 100 league appearances for Hearts, played in international matches while with the club, or set a club record. Some players who made a significant contribution in under 100 appearances are also included, for instance those who were a key part of the club's early history (e.g. Tom Purdie or Nick Ross). In some cases appearance records are incomplete, or the player's career may have predated the founding of the Scottish football league system in 1890–91.

Notable players

Bold type indicates that the player currently plays for the club.

Key to positions
 GK — Goalkeeper
 FB — Full-back
 CB — Centre-back
 HB — Half-back
 MF — Midfielder
 W  — Winger
 IF — Inside forward
 FW — Forward

Notes

References

Sources

Players
 
Heart of Midlothian
Association football player non-biographical articles
Players